The Dhaka-Istanbul freight corridor  project is a proposed 6,000 km transcontinental integrated freight railway network connecting Bangladesh, India, Pakistan, Iran, and Turkey.
The code name of this corridor is ITI-DKD-Y

It is considered that a major boost for trade and economic development of the Asia Pacific region, a trans-container goods train link from Dhaka to Istanbul covering Bangladesh, Bhutan, India, Nepal, Pakistan, Afghanistan, Iran and Turkey. Although Bhutan and Afghanistan are not connected with railway route, Bhutan is connected by road to Kolkata and containers may be served to Afghanistan by road from railway station Quetta. Nepal is also connected to this corridor from Birgunj to Kolkata.

References

Proposed rail infrastructure in Asia